Fallnationals (also styled Fall Nationals or FallNationals) may refer to:

NHRA Fall Nationals; see National Hot Rod Association
ABA Fall Nationals; see American Bicycle Association
ATA Fall Nationals; see American Taekwondo Association